Cyclocotyla is a genus of plants first described in 1908. It contains only one known species, Cyclocotyla congolensis, native to central Africa (Nigeria, Cameroon, Gabon, Central African Republic, Republic of Congo, Democratic Republic of the Congo).

References

Monotypic Apocynaceae genera
Flora of Africa
Rauvolfioideae